The Big Durian is a 2003 Malaysian film by Amir Muhammad that combined documentary with fiction. It created history by being the first (and only) Malaysian film to screen at the Sundance Film Festival.

Synopsis 

On the night of 18 October 1987, a soldier, Prebet Adam ran amok with an M16 in the area of Chow Kit, Kuala Lumpur. Due to the thorny circumstances of the time and place, his amok triggered a citywide panic and rumours of racial riots.

Cast 
The Big Durian features 23 people: some are actors, while others are expressing their personal opinions. The first group includes Patrick Teoh, Low Ngai Yuen, Jo Kukathas and Rashid Salleh; while the latter include Farish A. Noor, Nam Ron, Anne James and Chacko Vadaketh.

Release
The Big Durian screened in over 30 film festivals, including the Singapore International Film Festival and Yamagata International Documentary Film Festival in 2003 (the former being a world premiere) to the Sundance Film Festival, the Hong Kong International Film Festival and the Vancouver International Film Festival in the following year.

Critical response
Variety magazine said: "Ambitious, sleek-looking docu examines wide array of ethnic, religious and political divisions in modern Malaysia." The Village Voice said that it is an "impertinent love-letter to the citizens of Kuala Lumpur that does not let them off the hook for their apathy."

See also

 Operation Lalang - Prebet Adam amok incident

References

External links

 DVD sales link

2003 films
Malaysian documentary films
Films about freedom of expression
Films directed by Amir Muhammad
Malaysian independent films
2003 independent films
Films with screenplays by Amir Muhammad
2003 documentary films